The 1970–71 UCLA Bruins men's basketball team won the National Collegiate Championship on March 27, 1971, in the Astrodome in Houston, Texas. It was UCLA's fifth consecutive national title, and seventh in eight years under head coach John Wooden. The Bruins defeated Villanova 68–62, but the Wildcats' runner-up finish was later vacated by the NCAA.

Smith Barrier, executive sports editor at the Daily News and Record of Greensboro, North Carolina, wrote: "Mister John Wooden has a watch factory out in Los Angeles. It's a bit different from most Swiss works. They don't make watches, they win 'em."

The Bruins' only blemish was a 89–82 loss at Notre Dame on January 23. The victory over UC Santa Barbara on January 30 began UCLA's record 88-game winning streak; it lasted nearly three years, broken on January 19, 1974, again at Notre Dame.

UCLA averaged 83.5 points per game, and allowed 71.1 points. Seniors Sidney Wicks and Curtis Rowe were selected to the consensus All-America team.

The Bruins opened NCAA West Regional in Salt Lake City with a 91–73 win over BYU, then edged Long Beach State 57–55 in the regional final.

At the Final Four in Houston, UCLA defeated fourth-ranked Kansas 68–60 in the semifinal game on Thursday night.

Roster

Schedule

|-
!colspan=9 style=|Regular Season

|-
!colspan=12 style="background:#;"| NCAA Tournament

Notes
 The Bruins also won the "Steel Bowl" in Pittsburgh in late December, defeating William & Mary and Pittsburgh
 Sidney Wicks was a consensus All-American and Curtis Rowe was named to the second team.
 Sidney Wicks received player of the year awards from the USBWA and The Sporting News
 November 21, 2010 – Sidney Wicks will be inducted into the National Collegiate Basketball Hall of Fame

References

External links

1970–71 UCLA Bruins at Sports-Reference.com

Ucla Bruins
UCLA Bruins men's basketball seasons
NCAA Division I men's basketball tournament championship seasons
NCAA Division I men's basketball tournament Final Four seasons
Ucla
UCLA
UCLA